Tropaeolum leptophyllum is a perennial climber in the Tropaeolaceae family. It is endemic to mountainous regions of Chile.

References 

Endemic flora of Chile
leptophyllum